Antofagasta Province  is one of three provinces in the northern Chilean region of Antofagasta (II).  The capital is the port city of Antofagasta. Located within the Atacama Desert, it borders the El Loa and Tocopilla provinces to the north, the Pacific Ocean to the West and the Atacama Region to the south.

History
Before 1866, this region was disputed and claimed by Chile and Bolivia. After the Boundary Treaty of 1866 between the two nations the province was part Bolivia, and was known as the Atacama Department, or the Litoral. The Secret Treaty of 1873 between Peru and Bolivia was followed by the Boundary Treaty of 1874 between Bolivia and Chile. Afterwards Chile defeated both Peru and Bolivia in the War of the Pacific of 1879–84. The Antofagasta region was occupied by Chile during the War and administered as the Antofagasta Territory (which was neither a province or department) until 1888, when the Antofagasta Department was created. It was officially ceded to Chile by Bolivia in 1904. Bolivia still argues that this was a forced takeover of part of a country by a stronger nation.

Geography
It is the second largest province in the country, second only to Antártica Chilena Province (1,265,853.7 km2),  which is not internationally recognized.

Like the other provinces of this region, Antofagasta produces for export copper, silver, silver ores, lead, nitrate of soda, borax and salt. Iron and manganese ores are also found here.

Demography
Of this population, 313,244 (98.3%) lived in urban areas and 5,535 (1.7%) in rural areas. Between the 1992 and 2002 censuses, the population grew by 29.1% (71,779 persons).

Besides Antofagasta, the principal towns are Taltal and Mejillones.

Administration
As a province, Antofagasta is a second-level administrative division of Chile, which is further subdivided into four communes (comunas). The province is administered by a presidentially appointed regional delegate. Government headquarters, before the suppression of provincial governments, were located at Arturo Prat N° 384, Piso 6, Antofagasta.

References

External links
  Government of Antofagasta

 
Provinces of Chile
Provinces of Antofagasta Region